Ivanovskaya Lisitsa is a rural locality (a selo) and the administrative center of Ivano-Lisichanskoye Rural Settlement, Grayvoronsky District, Belgorod Oblast, Russia. The population was 841 as of 2010. There are 7 streets.

Geography 
Ivanovskaya Lisitsa is located 29 km north of Grayvoron (the district's administrative centre) by road. Kazachya Lisitsa is the nearest rural locality.

References 

Rural localities in Grayvoronsky District